Spencer Hadley (born October 30, 1989) is an American football linebacker who is currently a free agent. He played college football at Brigham Young University from 2008 to 2013. He served a two-year Mormon mission in the Rosevile California Mission from 2009 to 2010.

Professional career

New Orleans Saints
Hadley was signed by the New Orleans Saints on May 12, 2014, but was later released.

Oakland Raiders
Hadley was signed by the Oakland Raiders on August 6, 2014 and was a member of the practice squad, up until December 20, 2014 when he was added to the active roster. He was waived September 5, 2015.

References

External links
BYU Cougars Bio
Oakland Raiders Bio

1989 births
Living people
American football linebackers
BYU Cougars football players
Latter Day Saints from Ohio
New Orleans Saints players
Oakland Raiders players
21st-century Mormon missionaries